Alberic is a municipality in the comarca of Ribera Alta in the Valencian Community, Spain.  In Spanish, the name of the town is Alberique.

References

Municipalities in the Province of Valencia
Ribera Alta (comarca)